Nabagram Assembly constituency is an assembly constituency in Murshidabad district in the Indian state of West Bengal. It is reserved for scheduled castes.

Overview
As per orders of the Delimitation Commission, No. 65 Nabagram Assembly constituency (SC) covers Nabagram community development block, and Niyallishpara Goaljan, Radharghat I, Radharghat II and Sahajadpur gram panchayats of Berhampore community development block.

Nabagram Assembly constituency is part of No. 9 Jangipur (Lok Sabha constituency).

Members of Legislative Assembly

Election results
2021 Assembly Election Kanai Mondal (TMC) win, 2nd position goes to BJP Candidate Mohan Haldar 3rd Position Kripalini Ghosh Cpim candidate.Suci candidate Barun Mondal 4th position

2016
In the 2016 assembly election, Kanai Chandra Mandol of CPI(M) defeated his nearest rival Dilip Saha of Trinamool Congress.

 

.# Swing calculated on Congress+CPIM vote percentages taken together in 2016.

2011
In the 2011 assembly election, Kanai Mondol of CPI(M) defeated his nearest rival Prabal Sarkar of Congress.

 

.# Swing calculated on Congress+Trinamool Congress vote percentages taken together in 2006.

2006
In the 2006 assembly election, Mukul Mondal of CPI(M) defeated his nearest rival Rathin Ghosh of Congress.

.# Swing calculated on BJP+Trinamool Congress vote percentages taken together in 2006.

2001
In the 2001 assembly election, Nripen Chaudhuri of CPI(M) defeated his nearest rival Arit Mazumder of Congress.

 

.# Swing calculated on Congress+Trinamool Congress vote percentages taken together in 2001.

2000 By-election
A by-election was held on 17 February 2000 following the resignation of the sitting MLA, Adhir Ranjan Chowdhury who was elected as MP In Parliament from Baharampur (Lok Sabha constituency).

1996
In the 1996 election, Adhir Ranjan Chowdhury of Congress defeated his nearest rival Muzaffar Hossain of CPI(M).

1977–2006
In the 2006 state assembly elections, Mukul Mondal of CPI(M) won the Nabagram assembly seat defeating his nearest rival Rathin Ghosh of Congress. Nripen Chaudhuri of CPI(M) defeated Arit Majumdar of Congress in 2001. Contests in most years were multi cornered but only winners and runners are being mentioned. In the 2000 by-elections, Nripen Chaudhuri of CPI(M) defeated Shyamal Ray of Congress. The by-election was necessitated by the election of sitting MLA, Adhir Ranjan Chowdhury was Elected to Indian Parliament from Baharampur (Lok Sabha constituency).Adhir Ranjan Chowdhury of Congress defeated Muzaffar Hossain of CPI(M) in 1996. Sisir Kumar Sarkar of CPI(M) defeated Adhir Ranjan Chowdhury of Congress in 1991. Birendra Narayan Ray of CPI(M) defeated Pradip Majumdar of Congress in 1987 and 1982, and Durgapada Sinha of Janata Party in 1977. Later Mr. Pradip Majumdar became the Chairman of Berhampore Municipality, West Bengal. He fought the elections and emerged successfully to become the head of Berhampore Municipality.

1967–1972
Aditya Charan Dutta of Congress won in 1972. Birendra Narayan Roy, Independent, won in 1971 and 1969. A.K.Bakshi of Congress won in 1967. The Nabagram seat was not there prior to that.

References

Assembly constituencies of West Bengal
Politics of Murshidabad district